She Defends the Motherland, is a 1943 Soviet drama film starring Vera Maretskaya and directed by Fridrikh Ermler. It was distributed in the United States by Artkino Pictures as No Greater Love, also in 1943, with a dubbed-English soundtrack.

Plot 
Praskovya Lukyanova, a rural villager in the USSR, first loses her husband in battle at the outbreak of WWII, and then her only, small son, who is run over deliberately by a Nazi tank driven by a soldier wearing an eyepatch, as the Germans take over the village.  Thus convicted of the need to fight back, she organizes her fellow villagers in the forest, where they have taken refuge, into a guerilla unit which first thwarts, then overcomes, the fascist invaders.

Starring 
 Vera Maretskaya as Praskovya Lukyanova
 Nikolay Bogolyubov as Ivan Lukyanov (as N. Bogolyubov)
 Lidiya Smirnova as Fenya (as L. Smirnova)
 Pyotr Aleynikov as Senya (as P. Alenikov)
 Ivan Pelttser as Stepan Orlov (as I. Peltser)
 Inna Fyodorova as Orlova (as I. Fyodorovna)
 Aleksandr Violinov as Nikolai Nikolayevich (as A. Violinov)
 ? as General Von Falk
 ? as The One-Eyed German Tankist

References

External links 
 

1943 films
1940s Russian-language films
Soviet war drama films
Soviet black-and-white films
1940s war drama films
1943 drama films